The Mission Citrus Growers Union Packing Shed in Mission, Texas, also known as Edinburg Citrus Association and as Growers Select Produce Packing Shed, is a historic packing house.  It was built in 1944.  It was listed on the National Register of Historic Places in 2002.

It was "organized and promoted" by John H. Shary, a grower and developer who first came to the area in 1911.

See also

National Register of Historic Places listings in Hidalgo County, Texas
Recorded Texas Historic Landmarks in Hidalgo County

References

Packing houses
Mission, Texas
Buildings and structures in Hidalgo County, Texas
Industrial buildings completed in 1944
Industrial buildings and structures on the National Register of Historic Places in Texas
National Register of Historic Places in Hidalgo County, Texas